Patricia Ellis (born Patricia Gene O'Brien; died March 26, 1970) was an American film actress of the 1930s.

Early years
Born in Birmingham, Michigan, most likely in 1915 (although she gave her year of birth to the Social Security Administration as 1920), Ellis was the eldest of four children born to Eugene Gladstone O'Brien, a Detroit insurance salesman, and his wife, Florence Calkins. Her parents divorced in 1929. She was later known as Patricia Leftwich after her step-father, Alexander Leftwich, "an eminent New York producer of musical shows." She had a step-brother, Alexander Leftwich Jr. Her childhood activities included singing and dancing, and she reportedly studied French and German.

A 1932 newspaper article said, "Since she was able to walk, Patricia has been familiar with the world of the theater, accompanying her father constantly to rehearsals and performances." That same year, another newspaper reported, "She understudied all her father's leading women in the last few years, assisted him with lighting and costuming, and knows stage production, too."

Patricia Leftwich attended Brantwood Hall School and Gardner School for Girls, and began her stage career after leaving school. She took classes in studio facilities while pursuing her acting career.

Stage
Ellis appeared with Chamberlain Brown's stock company at Mount Vernon, New York, and at the Riviera Theater, New York City.

Film
Given a film test while appearing on stage in New York City, Ellis was put under contract by Warner Bros. In 1932, she had two small parts, both uncredited, in the films Three on a Match and Central Park. That same year, she was one of 14 girls chosen as WAMPAS Baby Stars; Ellis was the youngest. Her first credited role was in the 1933 film The King's Vacation, starring George Arliss and Marjorie Gateson. After that film, her career took off, with her starring mostly in lower-budget B movies, but still working steadily. She had roles in eight films in 1933, co-starring that year with James Cagney in Picture Snatcher, and in another seven in 1934. She started 1935 off with A Night at the Ritz, in which she had the lead female role, opposite William Gargan.

She starred in seven films that year and another seven in 1936. Starring alongside some of Hollywood's biggest names, including James Cagney, Ricardo Cortez, and Bela Lugosi, Ellis's career was at its peak by 1937. Most of her roles were in comedy films, along with some mysteries and crime dramas, and by 1936, she was playing the female lead in almost all her films. She starred in five films that year, then only three in 1938, and finally just two in 1939.

Singing
After her work in film, Ellis ventured into music, saying, "I was just getting into a rut in Hollywood. ... I want to start a new career -- singing." She made a soundie in 1941. A review in the trade publication Billboard commented: "Miss Ellis isn't bad on voice and excells (sic) on appearance. Men will pay attention to her." In 1941, she and Henny Youngman headlined with Blue Barron and his Orchestra at Hamid's Pier in Atlantic City, New Jersey. She appeared on Broadway in Louisiana Purchase, a musical comedy.

Personal life
Ellis retired in 1939, leaving Hollywood behind. On July 12, 1941, she married George T. O'Maley, a successful businessman from Kansas City, Missouri. She settled into private life, raising her family in Kansas City. The O'Maleys had one daughter.

Death
Ellis remained married to O'Maley for the remainder of her life, dying of colon cancer on March 26, 1970 in Kansas City, Missouri. She was cremated.

Partial filmography

 Three on a Match (1932) - Linda
 Central Park (1932) - Vivian (uncredited)
 Lawyer Man (1932) - Law Secretary (uncredited)
 The King's Vacation (1933) - Millicent Everhardt
 42nd Street (1933) - Secretary (uncredited)
 Elmer, the Great (1933) - Nellie Poole
 Picture Snatcher (1933) - Patricia Nolan
 The Narrow Corner (1933) - Louise Frith
 The World Changes (1933) - Natalie Clinton Nordholm
 Convention City (1933) - Claire Honeywell
 Easy to Love (1934) - Janet
 Harold Teen (1934) - Mimi Snatcher
 Let's Be Ritzy (1934) - Ruth Sterling
 Affairs of a Gentleman (1934) - Jean Sinclair
 Here Comes the Groom (1934) - Patricia Randolph
 The Circus Clown (1934) - Alice
 Side Streets (1934) - Mary Thatcher (scenes deleted)
 Big Hearted Herbert (1934) - Alice Kainess
 The St. Louis Kid (1934) - Ann Reid
 A Night at the Ritz (1935) - Marcia Jaynos
 While the Patient Slept (1935) - March
 Hold 'Em Yale (1935) - Clarice Van Cleve
 Stranded (1935) - Velma Tuthill
 Bright Lights (1935) - Claire Whitmore
 The Case of the Lucky Legs (1935) - Margie Florence Clune
 The Payoff (1935) - Connie
 Freshman Love (1936) - Joan Simpkins
 Boulder Dam (1936) - Ann Vangarick
 Snowed Under (1936) - Pat Quinn
 Postal Inspector (1936) - Connie Larrimore
 Love Begins at 20 (1936) - Lois Gillingwater
 Down the Stretch (1936) - Patricia Barrington
 Sing Me a Love Song (1936) - Jean Martin
 Step Lively, Jeeves! (1937) - Patricia Westley
 Melody for Two (1937) - Gale Starr
 Venus Makes Trouble (1937) - Kay Horner
 Rhythm in the Clouds (1937) - Judy Walker
 Paradise for Two (1937) - Jeannette DuPont
 The Lady in the Morgue (1938) - Kathryn Courtland aka Mrs. Sam Taylor
 Romance on the Run (1938) - Dale Harrison
 Block-Heads (1938) (with Laurel and Hardy) - Mrs. Gilbert
 Back Door to Heaven (1939) - Carol Evans
 Fugitive at Large'' (1939) - Patricia Farrow (final film role)

References

External links

Patricia Ellis biodata, imdb.com; accessed October 3, 2021. 
Patricia Ellis profile, virtual-history.com; accessed October 3, 2021. 
Patricia Ellis (using her birth name Patricia Gene O'Brien), July 12, 1941 marriage certificate 
Patricia Ellis O'Brien "New York, New York Passenger and Crew Lists, 1909, 1925-1957" 
 Evidence supporting 1918 birth year: 1. 1920 US Census Data for Patricia O'Brien, daughter of Eugene and Florence O'Brien, Detroit, Michigan (Patricia Ellis's birthplace, Birmingham, Wayne County, is a suburb of Detroit, Michigan).2. "Patricia Ellis Feels No Older As She Turns 21", Argus Leader (Sioux Falls, South Dakota), June 15, 1939, p. 20. 3. "Marriage Revealed by Patricia Ellis", Detroit Free Press (Detroit, Michigan), July 15, 1941, p. 4. 4. USS Roma ship manifest, arriving New York October 1, 1937, listed passenger Patricia Ellis O'Brien, age 19, as born May 20, 1918, Detroit, Michigan, and living in Beverly Hills, California. 5. "Hollywood's Youngest Leading Lady" St. Louis Post-Dispatch (St. Louis, Missouri), April 10, 1935, p. 37. 6. "Only 17, But Going Places" Cincinnati Enquirer (Cincinnati, Ohio), December 8, 1935, p. 100. 7. "Patricia Ellis Weds in East", Los Angeles Times (Los Angeles, California), July 15, 1941, p. 23 8. "Pat's Pal, 'Banksy'" by Jeremy Asher, Modern Screen, April, 1936, pp. 20-21, 114

American film actresses
Actresses from Michigan
Warner Bros. contract players
WAMPAS Baby Stars
20th-century American actresses
1970 deaths
Year of birth uncertain
Deaths from colorectal cancer
Deaths from cancer in Missouri
People from Birmingham, Michigan